Octavie Modert (born 15 November 1966) is a politician from Luxembourg.

She was born in Grevenmacher, and she studied in Strasbourg and Reading.

Octavie Modert belongs to the Christian Social People's Party, a major political party in Luxembourg. In 2004, she was elected to the Chamber of Deputies. She became Secretary of State for Relations with Parliament, Secretary of State for Agriculture, Viticulture and Rural Development, and Secretary of State for Culture, Higher Education and Research during the same year. She is the youngest member of the 2004 Government.

References

 eu2005.lu

Members of the Chamber of Deputies (Luxembourg)
Members of the Chamber of Deputies (Luxembourg) from Est
Christian Social People's Party politicians
1966 births
Living people
People from Grevenmacher
21st-century Luxembourgian politicians
21st-century Luxembourgian women politicians#
Female justice ministers